Ryan Riess (born June 21, 1990) is an American professional poker player best known for winning the 2013 World Series of Poker Main Event.

Education
Riess attended Waterford Our Lady of the Lakes High School and graduated from Michigan State University with a Hospitality Business degree.

Personal life
Ryan Riess lives in Las Vegas. He has a girlfriend and declared in an interview that he is expecting to have a child around March 2019.

Poker career
His first career tournament cash came in October 2012, when he took 2nd place at the World Series of Poker Circuit main event in Hammond, Indiana, for $239,063. In the following few months, he had several cashes in smaller events throughout the United States. Riess first played the WSOP in 2013, cashing in 3 preliminary events with a best finish of 11th in a $1,000 No Limit Hold'em event. Playing in his first WSOP Main Event, he made the November Nine in 5th chip position with 25,875,000. After eliminating 4 players at the final table, Riess entered heads-up against Jay Farber with a nearly 20 million chip deficit. After 90 hands of heads-up play, Riess's  defeated Farber's  to win the championship bracelet and $8,361,570.

In April 2017 Riess won his first World Poker Tour title at the Seminole Hard Rock Poker Finale, earning $716,000.

As of May 2020, Riess's total live tournament winnings exceed $14,990,000 of which $9,970,113 have come from cashes at the WSOP.

References

External links
Hendon Mob profile
WSOP.com profile

1990 births
American poker players
World Series of Poker Main Event winners
World Series of Poker bracelet winners
World Poker Tour winners
People from Clarkston, Michigan
Living people